Central Holmes Christian School (CHCS), previously Central Holmes Academy, is a private non-sectarian Christian school in Lexington, Mississippi. It includes elementary, middle, and high school grades 1-12. The school has a controversial history as a segregation academy.

History

In the late 1960s, public schools in Holmes County, Mississippi and across the state were being racially integrated. The majority of the county population was black, as in many parts of the Delta. Many white parents withdrew their children from the public system and began sending them to Central Holmes, a newly established private school. James Charles Cobb wrote that Central Holmes Academy had been "hastily constructed" as a segregation academy. The Wall Street Journal reported that the school was established by a chapter of the White Citizens' Council. A group of young men enrolled in a vocational program funded by the federal government of the United States used their training to establish the school.

On its establishment, almost every white child in Lexington was enrolled in Central Holmes Christian Academy to avoid having them attend school with black children. But across the state as a whole, only a very small minority of white students were withdrawn to attend private schools; most stayed in public schools. In 2016, Central Holmes Christian School had 265 students enrolled. Of these, thirty-one (14%) were nonwhite, while about 70% of the population of the town of Lexington was black.

Alumni
Melany Neilson - author

References

Further reading
 Bolton, Charles C. The Hardest Deal of All: The Battle Over School Integration in Mississippi, 1870-1980. University Press of Mississippi, 2005. , 9781604730609.
 Cobb, James Charles. The Most Southern Place on Earth: The Mississippi Delta and the Roots of Regional Identity. Oxford University Press, 1994. , 9780195089134.

External links

Central Holmes Christian School

Christian schools in Mississippi
Private K-12 schools in Mississippi
Schools in Holmes County, Mississippi
Segregation academies in Mississippi